"Kesärenkaat" is a song by Finnish singer Robin. Released on 1 June 2014, the song peaked at number one on the Finnish Singles Chart.

Chart performance

References

2014 singles
Robin (singer) songs
Finnish-language songs
2014 songs
Number-one singles in Finland